Coralliophila fimbriata is a species of sea snail, a marine gastropod mollusk in the family Muricidae, the murex snails or rock snails.

Description
The shell size varies between 8 mm and 27 mm

Distribution
This species is distributed in the Red Sea, in the Indian Ocean along Mauritius and the Mascarene Basin and in the Indo-West Pacific.

References

 Dautzenberg, Ph. (1929). Mollusques testacés marins de Madagascar. Faune des Colonies Francaises, Tome III
 Drivas, J. & M. Jay (1988). Coquillages de La Réunion et de l'île Maurice
 Oliverio M. (2008) Coralliophilinae (Neogastropoda: Muricidae) from the southwest Pacific. In: V. Héros, R.H. Cowie & P. Bouchet (eds), Tropical Deep-Sea Benthos 25. Mémoires du Muséum National d'Histoire Naturelle 196: 481–585. page(s): 517

External links
 

Gastropods described in 1852
Coralliophila